The Israel Defense Forces 460th “Bnei Or”/”Sons of Light” Armor Brigade is the training formation for Israel's Armored Forces. It is subordinate to the Southern Regional Command located in Shizafon base.

Units 
 195th "Adam" Training Battalion with Merkava 4
 198th "Ezuz" Training Battalion with Merkava 3
 532nd "Shelah" Training Battalion with Merkava 4
 196th "Shahak" Tank Commanders Training Battalion
 "Magen"/"Shield" Tank Instructors Training Battalion

Notes

Brigades of Israel
Southern Command (Israel)